Rebecca Albertalli (née Goldstein; born November 17, 1982) is an American author of young adult fiction and former psychologist. She is best known for her 2015 debut novel, Simon vs. the Homo Sapiens Agenda, which was adapted into the 2018 film Love, Simon and inspired the spin-off television series Love, Victor.

Life and career 
Albertalli was born and raised in the Atlanta metropolitan area, with her sister Caroline and brother Sam; where she still lives with her husband Brian, and two sons, Owen and Henry. Albertalli attended Wesleyan University and majored in psychology, before moving to Washington, D.C. and earning her Doctor of Psychology degree from George Washington University. She worked as a psychologist until 2012—when her first son was born—and subsequently decided to try writing a novel. Albertalli was raised in a Reform Jewish household. Albertalli cites Australian author Jaclyn Moriarty as her primary inspiration in becoming a novelist. In August 2020, Albertalli came out as bisexual in an essay responding to people who had criticized her for writing about gay characters as a presumed heterosexual. She stated that coming out was not an "attempt to neutralize criticism of [her] books" and asked her critics to acknowledge that "carelessness in these discussions has caused real harm".

In April 2015, Albertalli's debut novel was published, Simon vs. the Homo Sapiens Agenda. A sequel to Simon vs. the Homo Sapiens Agenda, titled Leah on the Offbeat was released in 2018 and won the Goodreads Choice Award for Best Young Adult Fiction. In 2020, Albertalli released the third installment of the series with Love, Creekwood. Her other works include The Upside of Unrequited and What If It's Us, the latter of which she co-wrote with Adam Silvera. Movie rights to What If It's Us sold to Anonymous Content in 2018, with Brian Yorkey attached as screenwriter. The film rights to The Upside of Unrequited was obtained by Shakespeare Sisters, a U.K. production company, in 2021.

Bibliography

Simonverse 

 Simon vs. the Homo Sapiens Agenda (Balzer + Bray, 2015)
 The Upside of Unrequited (Balzer + Bray, 2017)
 Leah on the Offbeat (Balzer + Bray, 2018)
 Love, Creekwood (2020)

What If It's Us 

 What If It's Us, co-written with Adam Silvera (HarperTeen, 2018)
 Here's To Us, co-written with Adam Silvera (HarperTeen/Balzer + Bray, Fall 2021)

Standalone works 
 Yes No Maybe So, co-written with Aisha Saeed (Balzer + Bray, 2019)
 Kate in Waiting (Balzer + Bray, 2021)
 Imogen, Obviously (Balzer + Bray, 2022)

Short essays 

 in Dear Heartbreak: YA Authors and Teens on the Dark Side of Love, edited by Heather Demetrios (Henry Holt, 2018)

Filmography

Awards 
 2015 American Library Association's William C. Morris Award for Simon vs. the Homo Sapiens Agenda 
 2017 German Youth Literature Prize for Simon vs. the Homo Sapiens Agenda

References

External links

 
 

1982 births
Living people
21st-century American Jews
21st-century American novelists
21st-century American women writers
21st-century American LGBT people
21st-century American psychologists
American women novelists
American women psychologists
American young adult novelists
Bisexual women
Columbian College of Arts and Sciences alumni
Jewish American novelists
Bisexual Jews
LGBT people from Georgia (U.S. state)
Novelists from Georgia (U.S. state)
Wesleyan University alumni
Writers from Atlanta
American bisexual writers
The William C. Morris YA Debut Award winners